Windsor is a town in Hartford County, Connecticut, United States, and was the first English settlement in the state.  It lies on the northern border of Connecticut's capital, Hartford. The population of Windsor was 29,492 at the 2020 census.

Poquonock is a northern area of Windsor that has its own zip code (06064) for post-office box purposes.  Other unincorporated areas in Windsor  include Rainbow and Hayden Station in the north, and Wilson and Deerfield in the south.

The Day Hill Road area is known as Windsor's Corporate Area, although other centers of business include New England Tradeport, Kennedy Industry Park and Kennedy Business Park, all near Bradley International Airport and the Addison Road Industrial Park.

History

The coastal areas and riverways were traditional areas of settlement by various American Indian cultures, who had been in the region for thousands of years.  They relied on the rivers for fishing, water and transportation.  Before European contact, the historic Pequot and Mohegan tribes had been one Algonquian-speaking people.  After they separated, they became competitors and traditional enemies in the Connecticut region.

During the first part of the 17th century, the Pequot and Mohegan nations had been at war.  The Podunk were forced to pay tribute to the more powerful Pequot, who claimed their land.  Eventually, the Podunk invited a small party of settlers from Plymouth, Massachusetts, to settle as a mediating force between the other tribes. In exchange they granted them a plot of land at the confluence of the Farmington River and the west side of the Connecticut River.  After Edward Winslow came from Plymouth to inspect the land, William Holmes led a small party, arriving at the site on September 26, 1633, where they founded a trading post. The spot of the trading post is at the confluence of the Farmington and Connecticut Rivers. The Loomis Chaffee School currently owns the land as the spot is now the school's sports fields.

Native Americans referred to the area as Matianuck.  It was about  up river from Long Island Sound, at the end of waters navigable by ship and above the Dutch fort at Hartford, offering an advantageous location for the English to trade with the Indians before they reached the Dutch. (The Sicaog tribe had made a similar offer to mediate to the Dutch in New Amsterdam.  New Netherland had far fewer European settlers than New England, and they were not in a position to take up the opportunity.)

In 1635, a party of around 30 people, sponsored by Sir Richard Saltonstall, and led by the Stiles brothers, Francis, John and Henry, settled in the Windsor area. Governor John Winthrop of the Massachusetts Bay Company acknowledged in a letter to Saltonstall that the Stiles party was the second group to settle Connecticut.

The first group of 60 or more people were led by Roger Ludlow, primary framer of the Fundamental Orders of Connecticut, having trekked overland from Dorchester, Massachusetts. They had arrived in the New World five years earlier on the ship Mary and John from Plymouth, England, and settled in Dorchester.  Reverend Warham promptly renamed the Connecticut settlement "Dorchester". During the next few years, more settlers arrived from Dorchester, outnumbering and soon displacing the original Plymouth contingent, who returned to Plymouth in 1638 after selling their parcel to a Matthew Allyn of Hartford.

On February 21, 1637, the colony's General Court changed the name of the settlement from Dorchester to Windsor,  named after the town of Windsor, Berkshire, on the River Thames in England. The same day, Windsor was incorporated as a town along with Hartford and Wethersfield.

Several "daughter towns" were formed from Windsor's original boundaries.  These include portions or all of Barkhamsted, Bloomfield, Bolton, Colebrook, Coventry, East Granby, East Windsor, Ellington, Enfield, Granby, Harwinton, Litchfield, Manchester, Morris, Simsbury, South Windsor, Suffield, Tolland, Torrington, Vernon, and Windsor Locks.

The first "highway" in the Connecticut Colony opened in 1638 between Windsor and Hartford. Two years later, the highway was extended north to the colony's 1636 settlement at Springfield, with the road also connecting to Wethersfield and thus the four settlements that came to dominate the region for much of colonial history were connected.

In the summer of 1640, an event took place that would forever change the boundaries of the Connecticut River Valley. During a grain famine, the founder of Springfield, William Pynchon, was given authority by Windsor and Hartford to negotiate a price for grain for the three settlements with the natives. First, the natives refused to sell grain at the usual market price, and then refused to sell it at "a reasonable price". Pynchon refused to buy it, attempting to teach the natives a peaceful lesson about integrity and reliability. Windsor's cattle were starving, however, and the citizens of Hartford were furious. With Windsor's consent, Hartford commissioned the famous Indian fighter John Mason to travel to Springfield with "money in one hand and a sword in the other" to threaten the natives, and thereby force the grain trade. The natives capitulated and ultimately sold their grain. After "negotiating the trade", Mason refused to share the grain with Springfield, and, to add further insult, insisted that Springfield pay a tax when sailing ships passed Windsor. Outraged, Springfield forever sided with the Massachusetts Bay Colony, a faraway theocracy based in Boston, rather than with the Connecticut Colony, which was much closer geographically and far more compatible ideologically. Windsor played a neutral role in the colonial rivalry between Hartford and Springfield; however, Windsor's direct border with both settlements caused many discussions about whether to align with Massachusetts or Connecticut. Ultimately, Windsor sided with Connecticut.

The Hartford & Springfield Street Railway, a trolley, connected with the Connecticut Company in Windsor Center until 1925.  Buses replaced trolleys between Rainbow (a northern section of Windsor) and Windsor Center in 1930.  Trolley cars continued to run from Windsor to Hartford until 1940.

The original Windsor settlers have many descendants around the country and beyond. Many are members of the Descendants of the Founders of Ancient Windsor (DFAW).

When the Springfield Line of the NY, New Haven & Hartford RR was built, station stops included Windsor station in Windsor Center with stations also at Wilson in the south of town and Hayden in the north, named for owners who provided land for the railroad right of way.  The line was double tracked until the late 1990s and redouble tracked in 2018.  Sidings at Windsor station allowed cars to be spotted at the freight house and on the Loomis trestle just to its south.  The trestle was removed in the late 1980s.  An 1856 brownstone arch bridge carries the tracks over Pleasant St and the Farmington River.  Incorporating a horizontal curve, its engineering was noteworthy when built.  Following a fatal grade crossing accident, a three-track-wide plate girder bridge was installed to carry tracks over Palisado Avenue.

Geography

  The Connecticut River defines Windsor's east border.  The city of Hartford, the capital of Connecticut, is adjacent to Windsor to the south. The town of Windsor Locks, home of Bradley International Airport, is adjacent to Windsor to the north. Prior to its incorporation in 1854, it was known as the Pine Meadow section of Windsor.  The towns of East Windsor and South Windsor are on the east side of the Connecticut River. The town of Bloomfield is to the west. The town of East Granby is to the northwest.

The Farmington River joins the Connecticut River in Windsor.  The Farmington River is dammed in the northwest corner of Windsor to form the  Rainbow Reservoir.

Historical points of interest
The Joseph Kesselring stage play and Frank Capra movie Arsenic and Old Lace was inspired by actual events that took place in a three-story brick house on Prospect Street, just off the north end of the Windsor green.  Sixty men died between 1907 and 1917 while in the care of Amy Archer-Gilligan. Most were proven to be victims of arsenic poisoning.

On historic Palisado Avenue, one can find the First Church in Windsor, Congregational, and adjacent graveyard.

Across the street on the Palisado Green stands a statue of John Mason, a founder of Windsor and a colonial leader in the Pequot War.  The historic plaque also honors Robert Seeley, Mason's second-in-command.  Nearby stands Windsor's oldest structure, the Capt. John Fyler house, built in 1640.

Further north is the home of Oliver Ellsworth, third Chief Justice of the United States.

The town center is well-planned in comparison to many others in the Greater Hartford area.  It has a relative diversity of chains and local shops, as well as a restored Amtrak train station dating to the 1850s.  The Vintage Radio and Communications Museum of Connecticut is located in Windsor.

From 1957 to 2006, the town was the location of the S1C Nuclear Powered Training Unit; a prototype nuclear power plant for the Naval Nuclear Propulsion Program.  The former site has the distinction of being the first nuclear reactor site to receive unrestricted release after demolition and decontamination efforts.

Other notable sites

Windsor is home to the following locations on the National Register of Historic Places:
 Allyn, Capt. Benjamin, II, House – 119 Deerfield Rd.  (added 1979)
 Giles Barber House – 411–413 Windsor Ave. (added 1988)
 Bissell Tavern-Bissell's Stage House – 1022 Palisado Ave. (added 1985)
 Broad Street Green Historic District – roughly along Broad St. from Batchelder Rd. to Union St.  (added 1999)
 Benomi Case House – 436 Rainbow Rd. (added 1988)
 Hezekiah Chaffee House – Meadow Lane, off Palisado Green  (added 1972)
 Taylor Chapman House – 407 Palisado Ave. (added 1988)
 Horace H. Ellsworth House – 316 Palisado Ave. (added 1988)
 George Loomis House – 1003 Windsor Avenue (added 1988)
 Gordon Loomis House – 1021 Windsor Avenue (added 1988)
 Ira Loomis, Jr. House – 1053 Windsor Avenue (added 1988)
 Capt. James Loomis House – 881 Windsor Avenue (added 1988)
 Capt. James Loomis House – 208–210 Broad Street (added 1988)
 Oliver Ellsworth Homestead – 778 Palisado Ave. (added 1970)
 Farmington River Railroad Bridge – spans Farmington River and Pleasant St. west of Palisado Ave.  (added 1972)
 Hartford & New Haven Railroad Depot – 41 Central St. (added 1988)
 Hartford & New Haven Railroad-Freight Depot – 40 Central St. (added 1988)
 Deacon John Moore House – 37 Elm St. (added 1977)
 Palisado Avenue Historic District – Palisado Ave. between the Farmington River and Bissell Ferry Rd. (added 1987)

Tobacco farming

Tobacco farming in Connecticut has a long history. When the first settlers came to the valley in the 1630s, tobacco was already being grown by the native population. By 1700 it was being exported via the Connecticut River to European ports. The use of Connecticut tobacco as a cigar wrapper leaf began in the 1820s.

Area farmers grew tobacco for the two outside layers of cigars, the binder and the wrapper. Approximately  of land in Connecticut is covered by Windsor Soil, named after the town.

The movie Parrish, starring Troy Donahue and Karl Malden, was set and filmed in the tobacco farms of Windsor. The film was released in 1961.

The Connecticut Valley Tobacco Museum, containing authentic farming implements and tools, can be found at Northwest Park in Windsor.

Demographics

Population
As of the census of 2010, there were 29,044 people, 11,233 households, and 7,881 families residing in the town. The population density was 984.5 persons per square mile (380.2/km). The racial makeup of the town was 54.7% White, 34.3% African American, 0.2% Native American, 4.5% Asian, 0.01% Pacific Islander, 3.1% some other race, and 3.2% from two or more races. Hispanic or Latino of any race were 8.4% of the population.

There were 11,233 households, out of which 28.1% had children under the age of 18 living with them, 50.9% were headed by married couples living together, 14.9% had a female householder with no husband present, and 29.8% were non-families. 24.1% of all households were made up of individuals, and 8.8% were someone living alone who was 65 years of age or older.  The average household size was 2.54 and the average family size was 3.04.

In the town, the population was spread out, with 21.5% under the age of 18, 7.4% from 18 to 24, 23.9% from 25 to 44, 31.8% from 45 to 64, and 15.3% who were 65 years of age or older.  The median age was 43.1 years. For every 100 females, there were 90.9 males.  For every 100 females age 18 and over, there were 87.8 males.

Income

According to the U.S. Census Bureau's American Community Survey, for the period 2009–2011, median income for a household in the town was $78,211, and median income for a family was $89,726. Male full-time year-round workers had a median income of $58,668 versus $50,529 for females. The per capita income for the town was $34,899.  About 3.1% of families and 4.5% of the population were below the poverty line, including 6.0% of those under age 18 and 4.8% of those age 65 or over.

Windsor was one of a handful of towns in the country where, in the 2000 United States Census, median income for black households ($64,159) was larger than white households ($63,624). Asian households had a median income of $75,716. Hispanic or Latino (of any race) households have a median income of $69,808.

High school demographics
Windsor High School has 1,471 students enrolled. Demographics for 2004–2005 were:
 Black 46.2%
 White 41.1%
 Hispanic 8.8%
 Asian 3.8%
 Native American 0.1%

Economy

Top employers
Top employers in Windsor according to the town's 2021 Comprehensive Annual Financial Report

Government

Windsor has a council–manager government. The legislative function is performed by a bipartisan Council of nine members, who are elected biennially for two-year terms. The Town Council elects a Mayor from its membership for the two-year term, and also appoints the Town Manager. Peter Souza has served as Windsor's town manager since 2004.

Connecticut House of Representatives:
 Jane Garibay (D)
 Bobby Gibson (D)
 Tami Zawistowski (R)
 Brandon McGee (D)

Connecticut Senate:
 Douglas McCrory (D)
 John Kissel (R)

United States House of Representatives:
 John B. Larson (D)

The following minor parties have registered voters in Windsor: the Green Party, Libertarian Party, Working Families Party, and Independent Party.

Infrastructure

Transportation

 Bradley International Airport, which serves Greater Hartford as well as the greater Pioneer Valley, is located in the adjacent town of Windsor Locks to the north.
 Connecticut Transit: There are eight routes serving Windsor: 15, 30, 32, 34, 36, 40, 54, and 92.
 The 30-Bradley Flyer route bus runs between Hartford and Bradley International Airport through Windsor.
 The 32, 34, and 36 routes run between Windsor Center and Downtown Hartford along Windsor and Poquonock Avenues. While the 32 route terminates at the Poquonock Park & Ride Lot, the 34 route continues on to serve the Walgreens Distribution Center in the Rainbow neighborhood, and the 36 route continues on to connect with the 54 route in the Day Hill Road Corporate Area.
 The 92 route provides crosstown trips through Windsor beginning at Copaco in Bloomfield and ending at the Shoppes at Buckland Hills in Manchester.
 The 40-North Main Street-Wilson route terminates at the Wilson Park & Ride Lot.
 Service to the Poquonock Park & Ride Lot is provided by the local 30, 32, 34, 36, and 54 routes as well as the 15-Windsor Express route, which provides express service between Poquonock Avenue and Downtown Hartford via I-91.

 Interstate 91 has 7 exits in Windsor, including a High Occupancy Vehicle (HOV) lane traveling north and south between Hartford and the Bradley Airport Connector (Route 20).
 Interstate 291 (Connecticut) begins in Windsor with 3 exits; it connects Interstate 91 with Interstate 84.
 There is a railroad station in Windsor Center with Amtrak's Hartford Line, Northeast Regional and Valley Eagle trains and CTrail Hartford Line trains stopping at the station.

Public safety
 Windsor Police Department is located off of Day Hill Road, at 100 Addison Road.
 Windsor Volunteer Fire Department has 5 stations: Windsor Station (at the Windsor Safety Complex), Wilson Station, Poquonock Station, Rainbow Road Station and Hayden Station.
 Windsor Volunteer Ambulance is also located at the Windsor Safety Complex.

Education

The public schools in Windsor are a part of the Windsor Public Schools:
 One public school for pre-school and kindergarten: Roger Wolcott Early Childhood Center (No longer in operation after school consolidation, children now sent to in district schools, Poquonock or Ellsworth.) 
 Four public elementary schools: Oliver Ellsworth Primary School, Clover Street Intermediate School, John F. Kennedy Intermediate School, and Poquonock Primary School. (Primary Schools: Grades K–2. Intermediate Schools: Grades 3–5)
 One public middle school (Grades 6–8): Sage Park Middle School
 One public high school (Grades 9–12): Windsor High School 
The magnet schools in Windsor are managed by the Capital Region Education Council:
 One magnet middle & high school (Grades 6–12): Academy of Aerospace and Engineering
There are two public libraries: Windsor Public Library and Wilson Public Library.

Loomis Chaffee, the well-known college preparatory school, is located in Windsor, on a  campus at the confluence of the Connecticut and Farmington rivers. The original Loomis Homestead, built by Joseph Loomis in 1640 and one of the oldest buildings in the United States, stands on the school's campus across the street from the current school head's residence.

Madina Academy, Connecticut's first full-time Islamic School, offers preschool through 12th grade

Saint Gabriel's School is a private school that teaches kindergarten through eighth grade. Trinity Christian School is a private school that teaches kindergarten through seventh grade. Praise, Power, Prayer Christian School is a private school that teaches kindergarten through twelfth grade.

Branford Hall Career Institute and Baran Institute of Technology are located on Day Hill Road.

Recreation and activities

Parks
Windsor Meadows State Park is in the southeast corner of town and runs along the shore of the Connecticut River.

Keney Park, in the south, straddles Windsor and Hartford; it includes cricket fields and a golf course.

Northwest Park, Windsor's largest park, is located in the northwest corner of Windsor.  It includes a nature center, trails and an animal barn showcasing a burro, sheep, chickens, goats, rabbits, ducks, and a turkey.

Welch Park is in the neighborhood of Poquonock on the Farmington River and is home to a public pool, a basketball court, numerous baseball diamonds, tennis courts, and a small playground.

Stroh Park is off Route 159 near Wilson Congregational Church towards the south end of town.  It is home to a public pool, tennis courts, a playground, and a pond.

Strawberry Hills Park is located on River Street. It is a popular location in the summer months for those interested in canoeing and kayaking the Farmington River.

Mill Brook Open Space, the former Mill Brook and Traditions golf course headed to housing development was purchased and protected as open space by The Trust for Public Land in 2014. This 95 acre property cost $2.1million dollars, with a $1,086,000 grant from the State of Connecticut to help preserve this open meadow. This property will serve as "land for passive recreation, wildlife habitat, community character along with water quality & storm water protection purposes". The proximity of the park to the town is also important in that it will put more than 1,200 residents within a 10-minute-walk to the property.

Events
The Northwest Park Country Fair is held every fall.

The Shad Derby Festival is held every spring in the town center.
Carol sing and torchlight parade mark the holiday season

Entertainment
 Keney Park Golf Club
 The Troy Donahue movie Parrish was filmed on Windsor's tobacco "plantations" in 1961.
 The movie Academy Boyz was shot at Loomis Chaffee in 1997.
 A scene in the movie War of the Worlds was shot along the Farmington River.

Religion

 Sanctuary of Faith and Glory Church
 Hopewell Baptist Church
 Truth & Freedom Ministry (Home Church)
 Pilgrim Way Baptist Church
 Grace Baptist Church
 Greater St. Paul's Baptist Church of Deliverance
 Saint Gabriel's Church, Roman Catholic
 Saint Gertrude's Church, Roman Catholic
 Saint Joseph's Church, Roman Catholic
 The First Church in Windsor, United Church of Christ
 Poquonock Community Church, Congregational
 Wilson Congregational Church, United Church of Christ
 Holy Zion Church of the Jubilee
 Mount Carmel Christian Ministries
 Faith Community Church
 Grace Episcopal Church
 Archer Memorial AME Zion Church
 Trinity United Methodist Church
 Christ the King Lutheran Church
 Congregation Beth Ahm, Jewish
 Oasis Christian Church of Connecticut
 Tohrah Judea
 Connecticut Valley Church of Christ
 Praise Power & Prayer Christian Temple
 Islamic Center of Connecticut
 International Gospel Fellowship

Notable people

 Al Anderson, guitarist, singer and songwriter, best known for his 20-year stint in NRBQ
 Christopher Isaiah Baker(born 1987), nicknamed "Swaggy", is an American football defensive tackle
 Moe Drabowsky (1935–2006), Polish-born Major League Baseball pitcher, raised in Wilson, schooled at Loomis
 Oliver Ellsworth, third Chief Justice of the United States, a drafter of the Constitution and American founding father, was born in Windsor
 Roger Enos, veteran of the French and Indian War and American Revolution who commanded the Vermont Militia in the later stages of the American Revolution
 John Fitch, inventor of the steamboat, held several patents, operator of the US's first steamboat line
 Edith Julia Griswold (1863-1926), lawyer and patent expert
 General William Hayden, Connecticut Adjutant General 1835–1836
 Mike Joy (born 1949), TV sports announcer, voice of FOX Sports' NASCAR TV coverage, served four elected terms on the Windsor Town Council
 Evelyn Beatrice Longman,  first woman sculptor to be elected a full member of the National Academy of Design
 Lancelot Phelps (1784–1866), congressman from Connecticut
 William Phelps (1593–1672), woodworker, judge, civil servant
 Joseph Hayne Rainey (1832–1887), first African American to be elected to Congress, US congressman from South Carolina, lived in a summer house here with his family
 Iceman John Scully, professional boxer, world title challenger, ESPN Classic boxing broadcaster
 John H. Swift (1840–1911), manufacturer member of the New York State Assembly, grew up in Poquonock
 Erastus Wolcott (1722–1793), political and military leader during the American Revolutionary War
 Oliver Wolcott, American founding father, born in Windsor
 Roger Wolcott (1679–1767), weaver, colonial governor of Connecticut (1751–1754), father of Oliver Wolcott

Principal communities
 Deerfield
 Hayden Station
 Poquonock
 Rainbow
 Wilson
 Windsor Center

See also
William Filley
National Register of Historic Places listings in Windsor, Connecticut
Hartford Electric Light Company
Mary-Ann (turbine generator)

References

Further reading
 
 "Windsor's Diversity Pays Off"  Stan Simpson, Hartford Courant, 12/6/6

External links

 Town of Windsor official website
 Windsor Historical Society
 Windsor Chamber of Commerce

 
Towns in Hartford County, Connecticut
Populated places established in 1633
Connecticut populated places on the Connecticut River
1633 establishments in Connecticut
Towns in Connecticut
Greater Hartford